Pir Soltan (also Romanized as Pīr Solţān) is a village in Abbas-e Gharbi Rural District, Tekmeh Dash District, Bostanabad County, East Azerbaijan Province, Iran. At the 2006 census, its population was 459, in 92 families.

References 

Populated places in Bostanabad County